The Sandgate Flyover is a grade-separated railway flyover that carries the Main North line across the Kooragang Island line, located in Sandgate, in the City of Newcastle local government area of New South Wales, Australia.

Description
Situated to the west of the Sandgate station, the overpass was built in 2006 by the Australian Rail Track Corporation to allow coal trains to access the Port of Kooragang without conflicting with services on the Main North line. The previous at-grade junction required that approximately 120 coal trains per day had to cross from the coal lines over the main lines to reach the branch line to the port. The main lines also carried about 120 trains per day.

At the time of the construction of the flyover, the main lines were raised over the junction of the coal lines to the Kooragang branch, so that the conflict between trains was eliminated. The flyover opened on 14 November 2006.

Adjacent to the flyover lies a siding used by Crawfords Freightlines.

See also 

List of railway bridges in New South Wales

References

External links 
 
 
 

Bridges completed in 2006
Railway bridges in New South Wales
Rail transport in the Hunter Region
Main North railway line, New South Wales
2006 establishments in Australia
Concrete bridges in Australia